VR Ambarsar (previously known as Trilium Amritsar) is a flagship shopping mall of Virtuous Retail situated in Circular Road, Amritsar, Punjab, India and is the largest mall in the Indian State of Punjab. The mall is spread over 6 floors, and  includes 250+ brands, 12+ Fine Dine and a 6 screen Inox multiplex.

Developed by Tata Group, the mall was opened to public in 2013 as Trilium. However, the group sold the mall in December 2019 for Rs. 700 Crore to Virtuous Retail which re-branded the mall as their flagship VR Ambarsar. The mall is spread over a gross sizeable area of 1 Million sqft making it one of the largest malls in the region.

About 
The mall was originally planned and constructed by Tata Reality and Infrastructure Limited (TRIL). Beside the mall, the complex also hosts 5 star Taj Swarna hotel owned by Tata Group. The mall was formally inaugurated by the chief minister of Punjab Parkash Singh Badal in February 2013. Taj Swarna hotel in the complex was formally inaugurated later in January 2017, which as per the group serves Amritsar and the adjoining cities of Jalandhar and Ludhiana. 

It is one of the few malls in India which LEED compliant and earthquake resistant. The mall is spread over an area of 5.54 acre making it Punjab's largest mall

Acquisition 
Tata Group, the original developer of the mall later sold the mall to Virtuous Retail in December 2019 for a deal costing 100 Million USD (Rs. 700 Crore). This was Virtuous Retail's 5th mall in India after Chennai, Bengaluru, Surat and Mohali. The group then re-branded the mall from "Trilium Mall" to its flagship brand "VR Ambarsar".

Entertainment 
Stores in the mall are all major key international and national brands across key retail, lifestyle and entertainment. The mall houses over 250 International brands in over 100 stores. The mall also hosts a six screen multiplex by Inox. The architecture of mall consists of two identical blocks-Block A and Block B both of which are inter-connected to each other by aerobridges across multiple floors. Behind both blocks, stands the Taj Swarna hotel which continues to be owned by Taj Hotels. Apart from these, the mall will host a food court with seating capacity of over 800, hypermarket, departmental stores and family entertainment centre.

Events 
This is the list of some of the notable events in the mall:

Gurupurab Specials (November 2020)
Punjabi Virsa (April 2016)
Summer Fest (June 2015)
Videocon Connect Contest (March 2015)
Trilium Women of Now Awards in Association with  92.7 Big FM (March 2015)
Drawing Competition (March 2015)
Acting Workshop (January 2015)
Khushiyan di Lohri (January 2015)
SAM Event (August 2014)
Summer Toon Fest (June 2014)
The Pakistan Show (May 2014)
Miss Amritsar 2013 Grand Finale (December 2013)

References 

2013 establishments in Punjab, India
Shopping malls in Punjab, India
Amritsar